is a Japanese light novel series written by Hitoma Iruma, with illustrations by Buriki. The series includes eight novels released between January 2009 and April 2011, published by ASCII Media Works under their Dengeki Bunko imprint. A manga adaptation was serialized in ASCII Media Works's Dengeki G's Magazine. A 12-episode anime adaptation by Shaft aired in Japan between April and July 2011, with an original video animation episode released in February 2012.

Plot
Makoto Niwa transfers to a new school and moves in with his aunt, Meme Tōwa. He is confused when he meets his first cousin, Erio, because he thought his aunt lived alone. Erio, who claims she is an extraterrestrial lifeform, does not attend school and wraps herself in a futon. Surprised by his cousin's eccentricity, he needs time to adapt to the tumultuous new life that has been sprung onto him.

Characters
 
 
 Makoto is a second-year high school student and the protagonist of the story, who transfers into the city after his parents go overseas. He constantly tries to monitor his 'adolescence points', which rise and fall based on his encounters with other girls. He strongly disbelieves in the supernatural, like aliens, espers, etc.

 
 
 Erio is Makoto's first cousin with blue hair growing down to her ankles and is almost always barefoot even when outside. She disappeared the previous June while she was a first-year in high school and went missing for six months. When she reappeared that November, she had no memory of what happened during that time. She also became extremely fascinated with aliens, believing herself to be an alien investigator monitoring humanity. Following an incident where she broke her leg while trying to fly on her bike, she started wrapping herself in a futon. Initially she is soft spoken and unsociable but eventually opens up due to Makoto's influence, which also included disproving her delusion of being an alien herself. She holds Makoto very dear to herself. She is reluctant to return to school (due to her shady reputation) so she gets a part time job at her great-grandmother's convenience store and even joins a pick-up baseball team to spend time with her cousin. Her birthday has apparently been forgotten, but her family decides to celebrate it on June 7, the day after her mother's birthday.

 
 
 Meme is Makoto's aunt and Erio's mother. She also goes under the name Jojo and is an owner of a store that sells sweets. She is cheerful and often teases Makoto by attempting to seduce him and actually cares for him a lot. She has no plans to marry and is happy with her life with her daughter Erio and her nephew Makoto. She allows Erio to stay home from school and do as she pleases. She explains to Makoto that it is the only effective way to deal with her daughter's eccentricities. Her actions do not make her look any less eccentric than her daughter, but it is shown that she is actually wiser than she usually acts. Meme's birthday is June 6.

 
 
 Mifune is Makoto's classmate and has feelings for him. Due to the kanji in her name, she is often nicknamed Ryūshi, which she does not particularly like. Correcting others when they address her as Ryūshi happens so often that it has almost become her catchphrase. She is vegetarian, referring to herself as a "fruitist" (fruitarian). She plays on the school's basketball team and has an energetic personality.

 
 
 Maekawa is another of Makoto's classmates who is very tall for a girl (she claims to be 179.9 cm tall) and always refers to Makoto as 'transfer student' as she can never get his name right. She later says that its kind of embarrassing for her to change the way she addresses Makoto(It is hinted that she has feelings for Makoto). She is very calm and sometimes expressionless perhaps due to having a weak body and sometimes amuses herself by teasing Ryūko. She gets dizzy if she raises her arms over her head for more than ten seconds, and often wears various costumes. Her parents own a bar in the shopping district and she has several part-time jobs. She insists on wearing cosplay to work even when her supervisor insists her not to.

 
 
 A white-haired girl who claims to be an alien esper, who is often seen wearing a spacesuit and occasionally talking in a silly alien-like manner. She is rumored to be a troublesome runaway and it has been vaguely hinted that she really possesses supernatural powers, however this is not made clear.

 
 
 Childhood friend of Meme and Elliott. He wears a cattle tag on his right ear, one of his granny's whims. He had previously moved away and returned to town in April. Ashiro proposes to Meme when they first meet again but is rejected right away, though he still adores her. His hobby is launching water rockets and is the son of a local firework maker.

 
 
 Makoto met this blonde boy when playing for the amateur baseball team. Ryuko tells Makoto that she had once confessed to Nakajima and that he had rejected her, explaining the awkwardness between them.

 
 
 The captain of the girls softball team and a terrific pitcher. She is also a ringer for the opposing baseball team. Hanazawa has a calm demeanor and is going out with Nakajima.

Media

Light novels
Denpa Onna to Seishun Otoko began as a series of light novels written by Hitoma Iruma and with illustrations provided by Buriki. Eight novels were published by ASCII Media Works under their Dengeki Bunko imprint between January 10, 2009 and April 10, 2011. One extra volume titled  was published on April 10, 2011.

Manga
A manga adaptation, illustrated by Masato Yamane, was serialized in ASCII Media Works' Dengeki G's Magazine between the October 2010 and September 2013 issues. ASCII Media Works published four tankōbon volumes between May 27, 2011 and August 27, 2013.

Internet radio show
An Internet radio show to promote the anime series and other Denpa Onna to Seishun Otoko media called  streamed six episodes online between April 7 and June 16, 2011. The show was hosted by Asuka Ōgame, the voice of Erio Tōwa in the anime, and was produced by Animate TV.

Anime
A 12-episode anime television series adaptation animated by Shaft, written by Yuniko Ayana, and directed by Akiyuki Shinbo and Yukihiro Miyamoto aired in Japan from April 15 to July 1, 2011 on TBS. King Records released the anime on seven Blu-ray and DVD compilation volumes in Japan between June 22, 2011 and February 8, 2012. The final volume contains an original video animation episode. The anime is licensed in North America by NIS America for a home video release in 2013 under the title Ground Control to Psychoelectric Girl.

Notes

Works cited

References

External links
Denpa Onna to Seishun Otoko at ASCII Media Works 
Denpa Onna to Seishun Otoko at StarChild 
Denpa Onna to Seishun Otoko at TBS 

2009 Japanese novels
2010 manga
2011 anime television series debuts
2012 anime OVAs
Anime and manga based on light novels
Comedy anime and manga
Coming-of-age anime and manga
Dengeki Bunko
Dengeki G's Magazine
Kadokawa Dwango franchises
Light novels
Seinen manga
Shaft (company)
Slice of life anime and manga
Television shows based on light novels